The enzyme 3-oxoadipate enol-lactonase (EC 3.1.1.24) catalyzes the reaction 

3-oxoadipate enol-lactone + H2O  3-oxoadipate

This enzyme belongs to the family of hydrolases, specifically those acting on carboxylic ester bonds.  The systematic name is 4-carboxymethylbut-3-en-4-olide enol-lactonohydrolase. Other names in common use include carboxymethylbutenolide lactonase, β-ketoadipic enol-lactone hydrolase, 3-ketoadipate enol-lactonase, 3-oxoadipic enol-lactone hydrolase, and β-ketoadipate enol-lactone hydrolase.  This enzyme participates in benzoate degradation via hydroxylation.

References 

 
 

EC 3.1.1
Enzymes of unknown structure